A cutie is a person or animal exhibiting cuteness.

Cutie may also refer to:
 Alberto Cutié (born 1969), priest and TV and radio host
 Cutie Mui (born 1966), Hong Kong actress and television host
 Cutie Suzuki, ring name of Japanese retired professional wrestler born Yumi Suzuki in 1969
 Mark 27 torpedo or Cutie, a torpedo used by the US Navy beginning in World War II
 Cuties, a 2020 French film

See also 
 Cutie Q, a 1979 arcade game
 Cute (disambiguation)
 QT (disambiguation)